Alvin Endt (September 28, 1933 – June 20, 2016) was an American educator and politician.

Early life 
Born in Ocean Springs, Mississippi, Endt graduated from the University of Southern Mississippi. He taught history in high school. Endt served on the Ocean Springs city council and on the Jackson County, Mississippi Board of Supervisors. From 1984 to 1999, Endt served in the Mississippi House of Representatives. Endt was a Democrat. In 1990, Endt, with three other Mississippi state legislators, left the Democratic Party and joined the Republican Party. He died in Ocean Springs, Mississippi.

Notes

External links
Ocean Springs Archives-The Endt Family

1933 births
2016 deaths
People from Ocean Springs, Mississippi
University of Southern Mississippi alumni
Educators from Mississippi
Mississippi Democrats
Mississippi Republicans
County supervisors in Mississippi
Mississippi city council members
Members of the Mississippi House of Representatives